The Depresión Momposina Province is  a subregion of the Bolívar Department of Colombia.

References 

Provinces of Bolívar Department